is a Japanese four-panel manga series by Yuiko Tokumi, serialized in Houbunsha's seinen manga magazine Manga Time Kirara since 2013. It has been collected into nine tankōbon volumes. A 12-episode anime television series adaptation by CloverWorks aired between January 7 and March 25, 2018.

Premise
Following an unfortunately timed case of the mumps, middle school student Hana Ichinose ends up missing all of her high school exams. Unable to stay in her hometown, Hana moves into her cousin's apartment building and spends a gap year as a "middle school rōnin", before finally attending high school a year later than planned. The series follows Hana as she spends time with her new friends, Eiko, Kamuri, and Tamate, without letting on that she is a year older than them.

Characters

Main characters

Hana is a shy, modest girl who is good at studying, though not athletic. After catching mumps and missing out on her high school entry exams, she was forced to take a gap year and moved into her cousin's apartment building before attending Hoshio Private Academy as a first year. As a result, she is very self-conscious about her current standing and that she does not have anyone of her old school friends in her company, and is therefore very glad to build up an immediate friendship with Eiko, Kamuri and Tamate. Named after .

Tamate is a bubbly, energetic girl from Hana's class who likes to be friends with everyone she meets. She is notable for her protruding upper-jaw incisors, and likes to be called "Tama", due to her dislike for her full name's association with the word tamatebako. She lives with her two grandmothers and enjoys cooking. Named after .

Kamuri is a childlike girl whose physical development greatly lags behind her actual age. She is an old friend of Eiko from elementary school, whom she adores, and becomes timid around others whenever she is absent. Whenever she is addressed with a sensitive topic, she somehow manages to twitch her hair ribbon as an expression. Her main hobbies are eating and sleeping (the latter of which is perhaps the primary reason for her belated development), although she is an extremely fast runner at sports. Her name is derived from kanmuriwashi. Named after .

Eiko is a gentle and level-headed girl with a natural charisma which has made her very popular with her peers without any effort. She likes making accessories, and has a crush on her homeroom teacher Kiyose Enami. Named after .

A resident of the apartment building where Hana and Shion live. After an experience not dissimilar to Hana's led her to miss her university exams, the guilt of lying to her peers caused her to become a shut-in. She soon starts to become more confident after meeting Hana and is one of the few people who knows about her situation. Named after .

Hana's adult cousin and the landlady of a boarding house, where Hana resides for the duration of her high school period. She is pretty and extremely well-endowed, but behaves more like a teenager than an adult woman. Her favorite hobby is taking a close interest in Hana's private life. Named after .

Hana's homeroom teacher, who appears lethargic all the time and uninterested in performing her job. It is because of these traits that she becomes an object of interest for Eiko.
She was originally scheduled to play a supporting role, so she is the only main character not named after a unit of numbers.

Classmates

She is the manager of the track and field club.

She is a member of the track and field club and runs a short distance.

She is a member of the gardening club and goes to school early in the morning to take care of the flowerbeds.

She likes Eiko and is stalking her.

Second and third year students

A second year student. Kasane transferred to school in the fall. Kasane was Hana's classmate at the end of her third year of junior high school. When Kasane reunited with Hana, Hana's gap year became known to Eiko, Kamuri and Tamate. Named after .

A second year student and the vice-president of the student council. She often strives to become reliable to Hana, unaware that they are the same age. Named after .

A third year student and the student council president. She has a weak constitution as a result of constantly neglecting her health and is often helped out by Tsuzuru. Named after .

Family members

Hazuki's father, Hana and Shion's grandfather. His first name is unknown.

Hana's mother. Her maiden name is Kyōzuka.

Hana's father. He is two years younger than Hazuki.

Eiko's younger sister, who is a year younger than her. She is supportive of her older sister and makes her soup everyday. Her similarity in appearance to Eiko is what led Kamuri to choose to go to Hoshio Private Academy.

Eiko and Miki's mother.

Eiko and Miki's father.

Tamate's maternal grandmother. Her surname is unknown.

Tamate's paternal grandmother. Her surname is unknown.

Kamuri's mother. Her first name is unknown.

Kamuri's father.

Media

Manga
The manga series by Yuiko Tokumi began serialization in Houbunsha's seinen manga magazine Manga Time Kirara in 2013. As of October 2021, the series has been compiled into eight tankōbon volumes. An anthology comic was released on February 27, 2018.

Anime
An anime television series adaptation, directed by Hiroyuki Hashimoto and produced by CloverWorks, aired in Japan between January 7 and March 25, 2018. Mio Inoue supervised the series' scripts and Masato Yasuno designed the characters. Aniplex of America have licensed the anime and are streaming it on Crunchyroll. The series ran for 12 episodes.

Video game
Characters from the series appear alongside other Manga Time Kirara characters in the 2018 mobile RPG, Kirara Fantasia.

Reception
Anime News Network had four editors review the first episode of the anime: James Beckett commended the pastel colors and intricate character animation for making up the overall aesthetics to appeal to its target audience but was heavily critical of the thin setup and bland characters being similar to every other all-girl slice-of-life series; Rebecca Silverman saw some promise in the series due to Tomomi Mineuchi's naturalistic performance as Eiko and an exploration into Hana's backstory and shy personality but felt the premise was put behind in favor of overly cute girls talking and having nonsensical adventures, calling it "the palest of several similar shows to debut thus far" in the season; Theron Martin gave credit to director Hiroyuki Hashimoto for competently adapting a piece of fluff with an intriguing gimmick involving Hana's situation but felt it was a lesser offering in comparison to similarly, stronger-themed slice-of-life shows filling the season. The fourth reviewer, Lynzee Loveridge, was put off by the infantile cast of high school girls having "caricatures of female relationships" with uninteresting topics and the overly sweet art style encompassing the episode without a hint of realism to ground it. Vrai Kraiser of Anime Feminist, reviewing the show's first episode, was critical, saying she felt uncomfortable after watching the first episode, that the characters feel "manufactured to be pwecious and kyoot", argued that the series is "extremely alienating...hollow and dead-eyed," and said that fans of moe "deserve better" than the series.

Notes

References

External links
Anime official website 

Anime series based on manga
CloverWorks
Comedy anime and manga
Houbunsha manga
LGBT in anime and manga
School life in anime and manga
Seinen manga
Slice of life anime and manga
Yonkoma